Sir George Henry Rose GCH (1771 – 17 June 1855) was a British politician and diplomat.

Life
George Henry Rose was the eldest son of George Rose. He was educated at St John's College, Cambridge. He was Member of Parliament (MP) for Southampton from 1794 to 1813 and for Christchurch from 1818 to 1832 and 1837–44, Clerk of the Parliaments from 1818 to 1855 and sometime Envoy Extraordinary to Munich and Berlin, and to the United States in 1807–1808 in the wake of the Chesapeake-Leopard Affair. This last mission was an utter failure owing to the harsh and inflexible instructions he received from George Canning.

Family
In 1796 he married Frances Duncombe, daughter of Thomas Duncombe of Duncombe Park, Yorkshire. She was one of the wealthiest young women in the country. They had four children together:
 Major George Pitt Rose (1797–1851), married Phoebe Susanna Vesey, daughter of Major-Gen. John Agmondisham Vesey.
 Frances Theodora Rose (1798–1879), married George Douglas, 17th Earl of Morton.
 Charles Philip Rose (1799–1835), died unmarried.
 Field Marshal Hugh Rose, 1st Baron Strathnairn (1801–1885), died unmarried.
 Sir William Rose (1808–1885), married Hon. Sophia Maria Andalusia Thellusson, daughter of John Thellusson, 2nd Baron Rendlesham.
 Arthur Robert Rose (1811–1869)

References

 Who's Who of British members of parliament: Volume I 1832–1885, edited by Michael Stenton (The Harvester Press 1976)

External links 
 

1771 births
1855 deaths
Alumni of St John's College, Cambridge
British MPs 1790–1796
British MPs 1796–1800
Members of the Parliament of Great Britain for English constituencies
Members of the Parliament of the United Kingdom for English constituencies
Members of the Privy Council of the United Kingdom
UK MPs 1801–1802
UK MPs 1802–1806
UK MPs 1806–1807
UK MPs 1807–1812
UK MPs 1812–1818
UK MPs 1818–1820
UK MPs 1820–1826
UK MPs 1826–1830
UK MPs 1830–1831
UK MPs 1831–1832
UK MPs 1837–1841
UK MPs 1841–1847
Clerks of the Parliaments
Clan Rose